Reset is a punk rock band formed in 1993 in Montreal, Quebec, Canada.

History
Reset was formed in 1993 by Pierre Bouvier and Chuck Comeau when they were 13 years old. The original band members were Pierre Bouvier (vocals), Philippe Jolicoeur (guitar and vocals), Chuck Comeau (drums) and Jean-Sébastien Boileau (bass). The original name for the band was Roach, but as another Canadian band was using this name, the band members decided to change theirs to Reset.

The band's first full-length album, No Worries, released in 1997, was recorded at Le Studio Morin-Heights and produced by Rod Shearer. The band shot a video clip for the single "Why?". In 1998, the band lineup changed. Bouvier took Boileau's place in playing bass and a new member, Adrian White from Vancouver, replaced Comeau as drummer after a conflict between Bouvier and Comeau (see song "Friend" – 1999).

In 1999, the band released No Limits, which was co-written by Adrian White. This album was recorded in Vancouver, British Columbia, and was produced by Greg Reely. Three video clips were filmed for No Limits: "Pollution", "Pressure", and "My Dream and I". Shortly after the filming of "Pressure", Bouvier left Reset to reacquaint with Comeau and form Simple Plan. David Desrosiers replaced Bouvier in 2000 but only stayed with the band for six months, being recruited by Simple Plan members to fill their bass spot.

In 2003, Reset released a third album, Radioactive. The album was produced, performed, mixed and mastered by Philippe Jolicoeur. This is the first album that Phil produced with his own record label, Indy Rekordz Inc. "Choke" and "Kyoto" are the singles and the new video clips for that album. On "Kyoto", Reset speaks about Kyoto Protocol.

In March 2008, they released their fourth album No Intensity. This album is similar to their first album No Worries, with anti-government songs like "Corrupted To The Bone", "Redemption" and "Papillon". The latter song is based on the book Papillon by Henri Charrière, an autobiography relating Charrière's numerous imprisonments and escapes from French penal colonies. The single for this album is the song 'No Intensity'. The album is produced by Rod Shearer, who also produced No Worries and the band's demo CD Concerned.

Over the years Reset participated in five Canadian tours and three American tours, the 1997, 2000 and 2006 Vans Warped Tour in North America. Reset has played with bands such as Green Day, MxPx, NOFX, Pennywise, Millencolin, Lagwagon, Face to Face, Strung Out, and Ten Foot Pole.

In March 2009, the band performed a special show with their original line-up for Musique Plus's (French Much Music) punk rock show 1-2-3 Punk! 10th anniversary. They played with GrimSkunk, The Sainte Catherines, Vulgaires Machins, The Planet Smashers and Subb.

Phil Jolicoeur stated the band planned to release a new album in summer 2012. The album, named "The Antidote", was later released in November 2012 through Cruzar Media.
The band did perform at two consecutive Amnesia Rockfest in June 2014 and June 2015. In June 2014, it was the original lineup that played. However, due to paternal duties, Jean-Sébastien Boileau did not perform, and David Desrosiers performed the set on the Budweiser Stage at the same time as Megadeth and Meshuggah. In June 2015, the band played just before Propagandhi's set on the Thursday evening called Fuck The Sponsors Night with the new lineup. The band released its latest album No Resistance in the Spring of 2021.

Band members

Current members
 Philippe Jolicoeur – lead vocals, guitar (1993–present)
 Claude Plamondon - bass (2005-2017; 2022-present )
 Steven Drudi - Guitar (2012-2017; 2021-present )
 Gopal Devanathan - drums (2015–present)

Former members
 Pierre Bouvier – lead vocals (1993–1999), bass (1998–1999)
 Chuck Comeau – drums (1993–1998)
 Jean-Sébastien Boileau – bass (1993–1998)
 David Desrosiers – lead vocals, bass (1999–2000)
 Dave Barbaccia – bass, vocals (2004–2005)
 Martin Gendreau – drums (2005–2010)
 Matt Kapuszczak – guitar, vocals (2010–2012)
 Julien Bédard – bass (2010–2011)
 Justin Brandreth-  bass (2011–2012)
 Adrian White – drums, guitar, keyboards, samples, backing vocals (1998–2001) (2010–2013)
 Cédrik Paquin - bass (2015–2016)
 Zenab Jaber- bass (2018-2019)
 Gilbert Vallerand - bass (2019–2022)

Timeline

Discography

Studio albums
No Worries (1997)
No Limits (1999)
Radioactive (2003)
No Intensity (2008)
The Antidote (2013)
No Resistance (2021)

Demo tapes
Insecticide (as Roach) (1994)
Concerned (1995)

Compilations
No Worries / No Limits (2006)

References

External links

Reset on MySpace

Musical groups established in 1993
Canadian punk rock groups
1993 establishments in Quebec
Skate punk groups
Musical groups from Montreal
Canadian musical trios